The One and Only  is a 1978 comedy film starring Henry Winkler, directed by Carl Reiner and written by Steve Gordon.

Plot
At a midwestern college in 1951, student Mary Crawford has the combined good and bad fortune to meet Andy Schmidt, a remarkably conceited young man who is convinced that he is tremendously talented and has every intention of becoming a star. Andy wants Mary to marry him quickly before he becomes too famous to give her a second look. She cannot resist him and takes him home to Columbus, Ohio to meet her straitlaced parents. Andy proceeds to annoy Mary's parents by hugging them, calling them "Tom and Mom" and interrupting dinner to do a series of impressions, thoroughly ruining the visit.

Mary and Andy elope and Mary moves with him to New York City, where he is certain that Broadway or Hollywood will beckon within a matter of weeks. Half a year passes and Andy gets nowhere. His ego is not bruised and he remains his same insufferable self. Mary takes an office job to support them. She gets pregnant and still loves her husband, but her parents are terribly worried for Mary and she has to ask them for money because Andy is not making any.

Andy does manage to make a friend, Milton Miller, a little person with a big ego. Milton, a struggling actor himself, tries to prove that he is a ladies' man, even to Mary's mother. After Milton tells Andy that he occasionally wrestles to make money, Andy tries professional wrestling as his new occupation. Though Andy doesn't have a wrestler's build, he behaves and dresses to create a character known as "The Lover" (a Gorgeous George type) who drives both opponents and audiences crazy. Andy earns thousands of fans.

Cast
 Henry Winkler as Andy Schmidt
 Kim Darby as Mary Crawford
 Gene Saks as Sidney Seltzer
 William Daniels as Mr. Crawford
 Polly Holliday as Mrs. Crawford
 Brandon Cruz as Sherman Crawford
 Hervé Villechaize as Milton Miller
 Ed Begley Jr. as Arnold 'The King'
 Warren Stevens as Hector Moses
 Hard Boiled Haggerty as Captain Nemo
 Ralph Manza as Bellman
 Chavo Guerrero Sr. as Joe 'Indian Joe'
 Dennis James as Cameo Role
 Rowdy Roddy Piper as Joe 'Leatherneck Joe' Grady (uncredited)

Reception
The film received mixed reviews from critics. Vincent Canby of the New York Times did not review the film positively, though he mentioned that he appreciated earlier works by Reiner: "The One and Only is more of that sort of safe, schmalzy comedy, but fatally lacking the presence of someone like the great George Burns." Roger Ebert of the Chicago Sun-Times gave it 2 out of 4 stars: "It's a pleasant movie, it has some genuinely funny moments."

On Rotten Tomatoes, the film holds a rating of 60% from 10 reviews.

References

External links
 
 
 
 

1978 films
1970s sports comedy films
American sports comedy films
1970s English-language films
Films about actors
Films directed by Carl Reiner
Films scored by Patrick Williams
Films set in 1938
Films set in 1951
Films set in New York City
Films shot in New York City
First Artists films
Paramount Pictures films
Professional wrestling films
1978 comedy films
1970s American films